Leviste or Le Viste may refer to:

Antonio Leviste, Governor of Batangas province in the Philippines from 1972 to 1980
Arian Leviste, Filipino-American electronic music artist, producer and DJ
Expedito Leviste, Congressman from Batangas province in the Philippines
Feliciano Leviste, Governor of Batangas province in the Philippines from 1947 to 1972
Jean Le Viste, sponsor of the tapestry The Lady and the Unicorn